Elberta, also known as Elberta Corners, is a hamlet in the town of Wilson in Niagara County, New York, United States.  It is located at the intersection of Braley and Randall Roads.

References

Hamlets in New York (state)
Hamlets in Niagara County, New York